Ramage is an unincorporated community in Boone County, West Virginia, United States.

The community was named after J. B. Ramage, a mining official.

References

Unincorporated communities in Boone County, West Virginia
Unincorporated communities in West Virginia